TALOS (Tactical Assault Light Operator Suit) was the name given to a powered exoskeleton, first proposed  in 2013, that United States Special Operations Command intended to design with the help of universities, laboratories, and the technology industry. The brief for TALOS stated that it had to be bulletproof, weaponized, have the ability to monitor vitals and give the wearer enhanced strength and perception. The suit would comprise layers of smart material and sensors. The suit may have not been intended for an entire squad, but to protect a lead operator who would breach a door first, the most vulnerable team operator in that situation. TALOS was not a program as such; it has been described as an "effort".

In February 2019 it was announced that the TALOS "supersuit" concept as originally envisaged was not feasible.

History
The TALOS concept was first presented by Admiral William McRaven, then-commanding officer of the United States Special Operations Command at a conference in May 2013. He said that the protective suit was inspired by one of his troops in Afghanistan.

United States Special Operations Command expected "1st gen capability" inside a year, though it has taken longer than that. Three unpowered prototype suits were to be assembled and delivered in June 2014. Development of the suit is a collaborative effort between 56 corporations, 16 government agencies, 13 universities, and 10 national laboratories. They are working together to incorporate features including a powered exoskeleton, full-body armor, and situational-awareness displays. SOCOM plans to hold a "monster garage" event to encourage mechanics and craftsmen to create components for the suit. They may seek permission from The Pentagon to distribute prize money to generate interest. Admiral McRaven expects a system to be fielded by August 2018.

Special Operations Command per Lieutenant Commander Li Cohen started and completed the selection process using prototypes that competed for the contract. Admiral William McRaven, who leads the Special Operations Command, says in the video, "I am very committed to this because I'd like that last operator that we lost to be the last one that we ever lose, in this fight or in the fight of the future." The command produced a video in 2013 saying that the program was on track to have a "first-generation capability" by summer 2014.

In response to 2018 reports that United States Special Operations Command missed the initial deadline to deliver a prototype for the high-profile tactical assault light operator suit, command leadership was confident that it would test a powered exoskeleton by summer 2019. Partners involved in the project include Defense Advanced Research Projects Agency, U.S. Army Research, Development and Engineering Command, and the Army Research Laboratory.

In February 2019 it was announced that the TALOS "supersuit" concept as originally envisaged was not feasible. A lower-body booster exoskeleton to ease running and long marches, removed before combat, remained a possibility.

Features envisioned
 Reduced impact of load by intelligent weight distribution throughout the body.
 Low power requirement.
 Low suit profile to fit under the existing uniform comfortably.
 Provide sensor cues to soldiers to reduce injuries.
 Integrated components to provide joint support where user needs it most.
 Reapply energy to enhance the efficiency of motion and improve overall metabolics.
 Remain compliant and flexible, stiffening only when needed.

Although the objective of the program was to incorporate new technologies into a fully powered and integrated suit, components developed under it could be issued individually to troops in the short term to enhance their effectiveness.  Non-lethal weapons, new armor materials, more compact communications gear, advanced night vision, and 3-D audio can be used as individual pieces of equipment before they are all put together in one powered exoskeleton. Items developed for TALOS including an increased tactical data storage capability which allows for ten times the capacity of current data storage has transitioned to fulfill an immediate operational requirement, as well as a new armor solution being used for special operations non-standard commercial vehicles.  Others systems that will be transitioned include a small, individual soldier SATCOM antenna, an unpowered loadbearing exoskeleton, a powered cooling vest to sustain body temperature, a next generation antenna that includes dynamic tuning, the Future Interoperable Radio Enclosure (FIRE), a tactical radio sleeve for cell phones, lightweight multi-hit ceramic-metallic hybrid armor, and a biosensor-equipped combat shirt that can monitor a soldier's physiological status.

Challenges
 Power demand might require a lot of additional weight due to the power source.

Defense industry leaders expressed skepticism about SOCOM's financial outlook and development schedule for TALOS technologies.  Admiral McRaven planned to have portions of a prototype by June 2014, with the first "independently operational combat suit prototype" delivered by July 2018.  Science and technology officials believe that technologies envisioned for the suit won't be achievable before around 2026; new technologies that need to be developed include next-generation full-body ballistic armor protection materials, powered exoskeletons for mobility and agility, conformable and wearable antennae and computers, soldier combat-ready displays with non-visual means of information display, power generation and thermal management, and embedded medical monitoring and biomechanical modeling.  Components made by different companies will have to be made to work together in one suit.  Power generation is the biggest problem, as there was no light-weight, low-bulk power generation system able to fuel TALOS components.  Funding is also a concern, as SOCOM planned to spend $20 million per year on development to total $80 million, which some see as far too low.  In previous endeavors to create "digitized" soldiers such as Land Warrior, the U.S. Army spent $500 million on three major contracts from 1996 to 2006 before its features became reliable.

Examples
At the 2015 Special Operations Forces Industry Conference, Revision Military displayed its prototype Kinetic Operations Suit on a full-sized mannequin.  Launched a year prior, the suit features a powered, lower-body exoskeleton to transfer the weight down to the waist belt and supports it with motorized actuators on each leg.  The exoskeleton supports a body armor system capable of stopping rifle rounds that surrounds 60 percent of the operator, compared to 18 percent with current armor vests.  To relieve weight, the leg actuators pick up each leg and moves it as the person moves, and takes the weight of the helmet, armor, and vest down through a rigid, articulated spine, transferring weight from weak areas of the neck and lower back.  A small power pack powers the suit, and a cooling vest pumps water through three yards of tubing under the suit to maintain core temperature; the power pack has a cooling fan that can be heard in close proximity, but it is thought that won't matter after breaching a door.  The Kinetic Operations Suit has undergone live-fire testing and combat scenarios and successfully performed the same tasks as currently-outfitted operators in similar amounts of time.

See also
 Powered exoskeleton
 Iron Man's Armor
 Starship Troopers
 Halo (series)
 Crysis
 Talos (Greek Mythology)

References

Military technology